Suzanna Maria Kempner (born 1 February 1985), also known as Sooz Kempner, is an English actress, singer and stand-up comedian who studied at the Royal Academy of Music.

Biography
Kempner attended Oakwood School, Horley. Her first stand-up gig was in 2009 at The Cavendish Arms. On 27 February 2010 Kempner made it through to the semi-finals of the UK Musical Comedy Awards. She was named Best Newcomer in the competition and performed at the final on 26 March. In March, she recorded the demo album for a new musical by Theresa Howard and Steve Edis, I Capture the Castle.

On 24 September 2012, Kempner won the Variety Award at the Funny Women Awards at the Leicester Square Theatre. From February to March 2013, Kempner appeared as Katisha in the Pulling Focus production of The Mikado at The Tabard Theatre in West London. Kempner's full Edinburgh Festival debut was at the 2014 fringe with the stand-up hour "Defying Gravity". In a review for Chortle, Graeme Connelly observed that "There was a lot of singing from [Kempner], but it was very much second fiddle to her manic and frantic stand-up, a brilliantly light-hearted way of forming interludes between distinct segments".

In 2018, Kempner performed her sixth solo show, "Super Sonic 90s Kid", at the Edinburgh Festival. In 2018, she performed in Doodle at the Waterloo East Theatre, The World Goes Round at the Stockwell Playhouse and as David Cameron in a new musical about Brexit by Richard Thomas and Jonny Woo. Kempner hosts the podcast Mystery on the Rocks, which began in 2019, with Chris Stokes and Masud Milas.

In 2023, it was announced she would portray Doom, "the universe's greatest assassin", as part of a Doctor Who multi-media series, Doom's Day as part of the show's 60th anniversary.

Filmography

Television/Online

Audio

References

External links

1985 births
Living people
Alumni of the Royal Academy of Music
English women singers
English musical theatre actresses
English stand-up comedians
Place of birth missing (living people)